The Chronicles of Riddick is a 2004 American science fiction action film written and directed by David Twohy. It is a sequel to Pitch Black (2000) and the second installment in the Riddick film series. Vin Diesel reprises his role as Richard B. Riddick and acts as producer, alongside Thandiwe Newton (credited as Thandie), Karl Urban, Alexa Davalos, Colm Feore, and Keith David. It follows the adventures of Riddick as he attempts to elude capture and face an invading empire.

The film received negative reviews. The Rotten Tomatoes consensus says it "offers some thrills" but calls it "a disappointment". It grossed $115.8 million worldwide, making it the highest-grossing film in the franchise but a financial disappointment. A third film, titled Riddick, was released in 2013.

Plot
Fugitive Riddick has been in hiding, evading bounty hunters and mercenaries sent to capture him. After killing a crew led by mercenary Toombs and stealing his ship on planet U.V., he heads to New Mecca on the planet Helion Prime, after Toombs reveals his bounty originated there. Riddick is reunited with Imam, a holy man he rescued five years earlier. Imam believes Riddick is a Furyan, a member of a race of warriors long thought extinct, and wants to know about his homeworld and if anyone other than himself is left. Imam believes Helion Prime is the next planet to be conquered by a mysterious force crusading across the stars. Aereon, an Air Elemental, identifies the army as the Necromongers, religious fanatics who seek to convert all human life and kill those who refuse. The Necromongers attack and take control of the capital in a single night. In the battle, Imam is killed and Riddick escapes.

The next day, the Necromonger high priest called "The Purifier" coerces the populace into converting, except for Riddick, who kills the man who killed Imam. Intrigued, the Necromongers' leader, the Lord Marshal, orders Riddick be scanned by the Quasi-Dead, half-dead telepaths, who determine that he is indeed a Furyan survivor. Lord Marshal orders Riddick's death, but Riddick escapes only to be recaptured by Toombs. Riddick is taken to Crematoria, a harsh subterranean prison moon, where Jack, the girl Riddick also rescued, is being held.

The Lord Marshal sends Commander Vaako to hunt Riddick down. Vaako's wife speaks to Aereon, who reveals that Furya was devastated by the Lord Marshal after he was told a child from that planet would kill him. Dame Vaako and her husband determine Lord Marshal wants Riddick dead, as he may be the child of said prophecy. On Crematoria, a disagreement breaks out between Toombs and the prison warden over what Toombs is owed for Riddick's bounty. Word about the Necromongers has reached the prison warden, who deduces that Toombs has stolen Riddick from them. In the prison, Riddick finds Jack, now named Kyra, and they reconcile with each other.

The guards kill the bounty hunters except for Toombs, take the reward money, and prepare to leave before the Necromongers arrive. After leaving Toombs in a cell, Riddick escapes the prison and leads several prisoners across Crematoria's volcanic surface to steal the ship. The guards reach the hangar, just as the prisoners arrive to find the Necromongers have cornered them there. All of the guards and prisoners are killed, and Riddick is incapacitated by Vaako. With the approach of the deadly sunrise, Vaako leaves Riddick to die and the Necromongers capture Kyra.

Riddick is saved by the Purifier, who tells him that if he stays away from the Necromongers, the Lord Marshal promises not to hunt him. The Purifier then reveals that he too is a Furyan and encourages Riddick to kill the Lord Marshal before committing suicide by walking out into the scorching heat. Riddick then flies back to Helion Prime using Toombs's spacecraft. Meanwhile, Vaako reports Riddick dead and is promoted to a higher rank by the Lord Marshal.

Riddick infiltrates the main hall on the Necromongers' flagship, where Dame Vaako sees him but encourages her husband not to warn the Lord Marshal and to let Riddick strike first and pave the way for Vaako to kill the Lord Marshal and take his place as leader. When Riddick attacks, the Lord Marshal presents Kyra, who appears to have been converted. Riddick fights the Lord Marshal in front of his army, who keeps the upper hand with his supernatural powers. When it appears that Riddick is about to be killed, Kyra stabs the Lord Marshal in the back with a spear and he punches her into a column of spikes, mortally wounding her. Vaako attempts to strike the wounded Lord Marshal, who uses his powers to evade the blow but is stopped by Riddick, who takes the opportunity and swiftly kills him. Kyra dies in Riddick's arms just before the Necromongers, including Vaako, kneel before Riddick as their new leader.

Cast
 Vin Diesel as Richard B. Riddick, the notorious criminal and last survivor of the Furyan race. Riddick has spent the last five years living in isolation to avoid bounty hunters and mercenaries.
 Colm Feore as the Lord Marshal, leader of the Necromonger faith. He possesses unnatural abilities granted to him after visiting the Underverse, the Necromonger Promised Land. He is the subject of a prophecy that foretells of his death at the hands of a Furyan warrior.
 Keith David as Abu "Imam" al-Walid, one of the survivors that Riddick saved in Pitch Black. Imam is now married and has a daughter.
 Alexa Davalos as Jack / Kyra, the other survivor saved by Riddick in Pitch Black. She sets out to find Riddick and gets sold into slavery before being sent to prison for murder. She changes her name to Kyra to signify that she's no longer an innocent girl.
 Karl Urban as Commander Vaako, a loyal Necromonger Commander who is tasked with hunting down and killing Riddick. Vaako is a competent soldier who is fiercely loyal to the Lord Marshal.
 Thandiwe Newton (credited as Thandie Newton) as Dame Vaako, Commander Vaako's wife. She doesn't share her husband's loyalty to the Lord Marshal and develops a plan for her husband to replace him.
 Judi Dench as Aereon, an Air Elemental who is kept prisoner by the Lord Marshal, who seeks her advice on how to deal with Riddick.
 Nick Chinlund as Toombs, a mercenary and bounty hunter who pursues Riddick.
 Linus Roache as The Purifier, a Necromonger priest who is also a Furyan survivor.
 Yorick van Wageningen as The Guv, a leader among the prisoners on Crematoria who makes the surface run with Riddick.
 Kim Hawthorne as Lajjun, Imam's wife.
 Christina Cox as Eve Logan, a mercenary who joins Toombs's new crew
 Alexis Llewellyn as Ziza, Imam's daughter.
 Peter Williams as Convict #2, a prisoner who makes the surface run with Riddick.

Production
Universal Pictures decided to develop a sequel to Pitch Black after the success of The Fast and the Furious, another action film that starred Vin Diesel. Diesel was offered $11 million to return for the sequel, a million dollars more than what he was offered for XXX. Universal hired David Hayter to come up with a script, which was later revised by Akiva Goldsman. However, Universal passed it up for a new draft from the first film's director and writer, David Twohy.

According to Diesel, the film's broader fantasy elements were introduced by him; the concept of Elementals came from Dungeons & Dragons, of which Diesel is a fan. Judi Dench was performing at Haymarket Theatre when Diesel made an offer for her to be in the The Chronicles of Riddick. Dench said, "Vin sent me a bouquet of flowers that were so big they couldn't fit up the stairs to my dressing room. They could not get them into the corridor. Then he asked if I would be in his film. And of course I said yes. Why ever not?" Filming took place in Vancouver, Canada.

Release
There are three versions of the film: the theatrical cut, which was PG-13; the Director's Cut, which is unrated (both are available on DVD); and the third version, a mix of the two assembled for television viewing, which has some, but not all, of the added footage from the Director's Cut. For instance, the minor subplot in the Director's Cut of Riddick's visions, as well as his moments with Toombs's second in command, are both absent, but the ending from the Director's Cut is present.

Reception

Box office
The production budget for The Chronicles of Riddick was reported to have been between $105 million and $120 million (not including marketing and distribution costs). It grossed $57 million in North America, and its total worldwide gross stands between $107 million and $115 million.

Critical response
On Rotten Tomatoes the film has an approval rating of 29% based on reviews from 167 critics and an average score of 4.60/10. The site's critical consensus states, "As an action movie, Riddick offers some thrills, but as a sequel to Pitch Black, it's a disappointment". Metacritic gives the film a score of 38 out of 100 based on reviews from 34 critics, indicating "generally unfavorable reviews". Audiences polled by CinemaScore gave the film an average grade of "B" on an A+ to F scale.

Slant Magazine gave the film 1.5 out of 4 and stated, "Eschewing the claustrophobic minimalism of its predecessor Pitch Black, The Chronicles of Riddick is an extravagant orgy of used sci-fi parts." Owen Gleiberman of Entertainment Weekly gave the film a score of 'C' and called it "mostly a ponderous chronicle." Claudia Puig of USA Today gave the film 1.5 out of 4 and criticized its pacing. Mick LaSalle of San Francisco Chronicle gave the film 1 out of 4 and stated that it is "an inane film rendered sometimes laughable by an atmosphere of dead-serious reverence." Ann Hornaday of Washington Post gave the film a negative review and stated that "The Chronicles of Riddick doesn't hark back merely to the classic horror or science fiction canon but to nearly every single cinematic genre in the book, from westerns to film noir to sword-and-sandal epics." Desson Thomson of Washington Post also gave the film a negative review and said that "the muddy, convoluted story revolves around the star's cool-guy poses and one-liners."

James Berardinelli of ReelViews gave the film 2.5 out of 4 and stated that "although The Chronicles of Riddick offers its share of solidly entertaining moments, it doesn't hold together as a single, coherent motion picture experience." Ty Burr of Boston Globe gave the film 2 out of 4 and called it "a hodgepodge of Lord of the Rings, Starship Troopers, and the more recent Star Wars films." Roger Ebert of Chicago Sun-Times gave the film 2 out of 4 and called it "an exercise in computer-generated effects." Paul Clinton of CNN gave the film a negative review and called it "a big, cheesy sci-fi flick tailor-made for a young male audience looking for things that go boom." BBC gave the film 2 out of 5 and praised Diesel's "imposing screen presence", but criticized its "risible dialogue[s]". Time Out also gave the film a negative review and stated, "The sequel baton pass at the finale is pretty nifty, but it's surely asking too much to think the filmmakers could leave us wanting more. Come to think of it, much, much less would have been best." Nell Minow of Common Sense Media gave the film 2 out of 5 and termed it a "very violent, brainless explosion movie." The Austin Chronicle gave the film 3 out of 5 and called it a "bloated, but enjoyable production."

Awards 
For his performance in the film, Vin Diesel was nominated for a Razzie Award for Worst Actor at the 2004 Golden Raspberry Awards, but lost to George W. Bush for Fahrenheit 9/11.

Spinoffs 
The film spun off books, an action figure line, animation and video games.

Video game 
The Xbox game The Chronicles of Riddick: Escape from Butcher Bay was released simultaneously with the film and was well-received. On April 7, 2009, a remake of the video game was included with the release of the game sequel The Chronicles of Riddick: Assault on Dark Athena.

Short film 
The animated short film The Chronicles of Riddick: Dark Fury was released by Aeon Flux director Peter Chung.

Director's Cut Version 
The "unrated director's cut" DVD (featuring scenes which were cut in order to obtain a PG-13 rating) was released on November 16, 2004, and sold 1.5 million copies on the first day alone.

Sequel 
A sequel was released in 2013 called Riddick.

References

External links

  
 
  
 
 
 

2004 films
2004 science fiction action films
American science fiction action films
American space adventure films
American sequel films
Films directed by David Twohy
Films set in the 26th century
Films set on fictional planets
Films shot in Vancouver
Films shot at Pinewood Studios
Planetary romances
Universal Pictures films
The Chronicles of Riddick (franchise)
One Race Films films
Films scored by Graeme Revell
Films with screenplays by David Twohy
American science fiction adventure films
American survival films
Films produced by Scott Kroopf
2000s English-language films
2000s American films